Tim Howes (born September 21, 1963) is a software engineer, entrepreneur and author.  He is the co-creator of the Lightweight Directory Access Protocol (LDAP), the Internet standard for accessing directory servers. He co-founded enterprise software company Opsware, internet browser company Rockmelt, and children's education company, Know Yourself. He has co-authored two books, several Internet RFCs, and holds several patents. (Howes has the same short name as a New Jersey politician, the chairman of the Somerset County County GOP Committee.)

Education and LDAP
Howes was born and raised in Ann Arbor, Michigan.  He holds a Bachelor of Science degree in Aerospace Engineering, a Master of Science in Computer Science and Engineering and a Ph.D. in Computer Science and Engineering, all from the University of Michigan.

While at the University of Michigan, Howes was tasked with creating a campus-wide directory service using the X.500 standard.  X.500 directories list network resources to make finding them and using them easier for network administrators and users. Unfortunately, accessing X.500 records has required a full-blown X.500 server; there was no such thing as an X.500 client. This led Howes to co-create DIXIE, a directory client for X.500 directories (as well as contribute significant enhancements to improve performance of the Quipu directory). This work formed the basis of his Ph.D. dissertation and was the foundation for LDAP, a standards-based version of DIXIE for both clients and servers.  The first publicly available version of LDAP was published in 1993.

Career

Netscape 
In 1996, after joining Netscape as directory server architect, Howes was named one of the Top 25 Network Technology Drivers by Network Computing magazine. In 1997, LDAP version 3 won PC Magazine's Technical Excellence: Networking award.  Howes was also named a Netscape Fellow, Netscape's highest engineering honor, and was promoted to Chief Technology Officer of Netscape's Server Products Division.

Loudcloud and Opsware 
In 1999, shortly after AOL acquired Netscape, Howes left AOL to co-found Loudcloud with Marc Andreessen, Ben Horowitz and In Sik Rhee.  Howes ran the engineering department and spearheaded the creation of Opsware, the company's data center automation software to speed-build sites. 
He was recognized by InfoWorld in 2000 as one of the top 10 e-business innovators.
In 2002, Loudcloud shifted businesses and was renamed Opsware.  At Loudcloud & Opsware, Howes held the positions of Executive Vice President and CTO.  In 2005, Howes was named a "Top 25 CTO's of 2005" by InfoWorld magazine. 
In 2007 Opsware was acquired by Hewlett-Packard for $1.65 billion, and Howes became vice president and CTO of HP Software.

Rockmelt 
In October 2008, Howes left Hewlett-Packard to co-found RockMelt with Eric Vishria.
In August 2013, Rockmelt was acquired by Yahoo, and Howes joined Yahoo! as Vice President of Engineering for Yahoo's Mobile and Emerging Products Group. He left the company in December, 2014.

Know Yourself 
In 2012, Howes co-founded Know Yourself, a public benefit corporation  based in Oakland, California, dedicated to making self literacy a vital part of early education. The company designs and sells products that teach kids about their anatomy, physiology, and psychology, including activity kits, books, comics, and various apparel and lifestyle products. Howes serves as CEO.

ClearStory Data 
In May 2015, Howes was named Chief Technology Officer for ClearStory Data, a leading cloud-based provider of fast-cycle data intelligence based on Apache Spark. ClearStory Data was acquired by Alteryx in April 2019.

Facebook 
In November 2018, Howes joined Facebook as Director of Engineering in Facebook's AI Infrastructure group, where he worked on improving AI developer experience.

Boards and awards 
Howes has served on the IETF's Internet Architecture Board.  He has served as a director on the boards of Blue Coat Systems and Homestead Technologies, as a member of the University of Michigan College of Engineering's National Advisory Committee, as a trustee of SFJazz, and he is technical advisor to various startups. In 2016, Howes was the recipient of the Arbor Networks PhD Research Impact Lecture and Award.

Personal 
Howes lives in Los Altos Hills, California with his wife, Nancy Howes, and their two daughters, Zhi and Madeline.

References

1963 births
Living people
Web developers
Computer programmers
American computer scientists
University of Michigan College of Engineering alumni
American chief technology officers
People from Ann Arbor, Michigan